Rowland's ring (aka Rowland ring) is an experimental arrangement for the measurement of the hysteresis curve of a sample of magnetic material.  It was developed by Henry Augustus Rowland.

The geometry of a Rowland's ring is usually a toroid of magnetic material around which is closely wound a magnetization coil consisting of a large number of windings to magnetize the material, and a sampling coil consisting of a smaller number of windings to sample the induced magnetic flux.  The electric current flowing in the magnetization coil dictates the magnetic field intensity  in the material.  The sampling coil produces a voltage proportional to the rate of change of the magnetic field  in the material.  By measuring the time integral of the voltage in the sampling coil versus the current in the magnetization coil, one obtains the hysteresis curve.

See also
Electromagnetic induction

External links 
 Photo of a Rowland's ring

References 

Paul Lorrain and Dale Corson, "Electromagnetic Fields and Waves, 2nd ed", W.H. Freeman and Company (1970).

Electromagnetism